Evington is an unincorporated community in  Campbell County, Virginia, United States. Evington is located along Virginia State Route 24, west of U.S. Highway 29, southwest of Lynchburg.

Caryswood was listed on the National Register of Historic Places in 2010.
Bob Good, the congressman for Virginia's 5th congressional district, lives in Evington.

Climate
The climate in this area is characterized by hot, humid summers and generally mild to cool winters.  According to the Köppen Climate Classification system, Evington has a humid subtropical climate, abbreviated "Cfa" on climate maps.

See also 
 WSET-TV

References

External links 

 Evington Community Association
 Evington Virginia

Unincorporated communities in Campbell County, Virginia
Unincorporated communities in Virginia